The Merthyr Tydfil League is a football league covering the town of Merthyr Tydfil and surrounding areas in Merthyr Tydfil County Borough, South Wales. The league is in the seventh tier of the Welsh football league system.

Divisions
The league is composed of one division. It has previous operated with multiple divisions. In the 1990s the league operated with three senior divisions, and a second tier division operated up until the 2016–17 season. Following on from this the league suffered from a lack of clubs, with only seven clubs completing the 2018–19 season, and ten, including two reserve sides making up the league for the 2019–20 season. For the 2020–21 season the league was not planned to function with eight of the league's teams instead being admitted to the Aberdare Valley League. The league returned for the 2021-22 season with a Premier Division of five clubs and a First Division of seven clubs. For the 2022-23 season, the league changed to just a Premier Division, sponsored by RTM Brickwork.

Member clubs 2022-23
The following clubs are competing in the Merthyr & District League during the 2022–23 season.

Premier Division

 Aber Wanderers
 Aberfan Rangers
 Baili Glas
 Bedlinog
 Black Lion
 Georgetown BGC 
 Gurnos
 Merthyr Saints reserves
 Pantyscalog VJ
 Trelewis Welfare
 Trelewis Welfare reserves

Promotion and relegation
Promotion from the Premier Division is possible to the South Wales Alliance League with the champion of the league playing the other Tier 7 champions from the South Wales regional leagues via play-off games to determine promotion.

Champions (Top Tier Division)

 1971–72: Hoover Sports
 1992–93: Mount Pleasant
 1993–94: Hoover Sports
 1994–95: Gellideg SC
 1995–96: Troedyrhiw B.C.
 1997–98: Bluebirds
 2006–07: Courthouse
 2007–08: Bluebirds
 2008–09: Bluebirds
 2009–10: Bluebirds
 2010–11: Bluebirds
 2011–12: Aberfan SDC
 2012–13: Pant
 2013–14: Bluebirds
 2014–15: Pantyscallog VJ
 2015–16: Pantyscallog VJ
 2016–17: Hills Plymouth
 2017–18: Hills Plymouth
 2018–19: Navi
 2019–20: Aber Wanderers
 2020–21: No competition
 2019–20:  Georgetown BGC

References

External links
 Merthyr Tydfil League

 
1913 establishments in Wales
Sports leagues established in 1913
Merthyr Tydfil
Football leagues in Wales